The 1953 Pittsburgh Pirates season was the 72nd in franchise history. In April 1953, the New York Yankees visited Forbes Field and played two preseason games against the Pirates. Mickey Mantle hit a 500-foot home run that landed on the roof.

Offseason 
 October 14, 1952: Gus Bell was traded by the Pirates to the Cincinnati Reds for Cal Abrams, Joe Rossi, and Gail Henley.
 Prior to 1953 season: Don Williams was signed as an amateur free agent by the Pirates.
 March 19, 1953: Johnny O'Brien was signed by the Pirates as an amateur free agent (bonus baby).
 March 19, 1953: Eddie O'Brien was signed by the Pirates as an amateur free agent (bonus baby).

Regular season

Season standings

Record vs. opponents

Game log

|- bgcolor="ffbbbb"
| 1 || April 14 || @ Dodgers || 5–8 || Black || Dickson (0–1) || — || 12,433 || 0–1
|- bgcolor="ffbbbb"
| 2 || April 15 || @ Dodgers || 2–4 || Meyer || Lindell (0–1) || — || 3,149 || 0–2
|- bgcolor="ccffcc"
| 3 || April 16 || Phillies || 14–12 || Dickson (1–1) || Hansen || — || 16,220 || 1–2
|- bgcolor="ffbbbb"
| 4 || April 19 || Dodgers || 4–12 || Erskine || Dickson (1–2) || — || 8,801 || 1–3
|- bgcolor="ccffcc"
| 5 || April 21 || Giants || 5–4 || Friend (1–0) || Maglie || — ||  || 2–3
|- bgcolor="ffbbbb"
| 6 || April 22 || Giants || 2–4 || Hearn || LaPalme (0–1) || Wilhelm || 10,603 || 2–4
|- bgcolor="ccffcc"
| 7 || April 23 || Giants || 6–5 || Pollet (1–0) || Koslo || Hetki (1) || 4,372 || 3–4
|- bgcolor="ffbbbb"
| 8 || April 24 || @ Phillies || 3–5 || Konstanty || Hall (0–1) || — || 6,506 || 3–5
|- bgcolor="ffbbbb"
| 9 || April 25 || @ Phillies || 6–7 || Simmons || Lindell (0–2) || Hansen || 6,265 || 3–6
|- bgcolor="ffbbbb"
| 10 || April 26 || @ Phillies || 5–7 || Roberts || Friend (1–1) || — ||  || 3–7
|- bgcolor="ffbbbb"
| 11 || April 26 || @ Phillies || 1–8 || Drews || Macdonald (0–1) || — || 18,490 || 3–8
|- bgcolor="ffbbbb"
| 12 || April 28 || Cubs || 3–5 || Rush || LaPalme (0–2) || Leonard || 5,870 || 3–9
|- bgcolor="ccffcc"
| 13 || April 29 || Cubs || 4–3 || Dickson (2–2) || Hacker || — || 8,744 || 4–9
|- bgcolor="ccffcc"
| 14 || April 30 || Cubs || 4–2 || Face (1–0) || Minner || — || 2,930 || 5–9
|-

|- bgcolor="ccffcc"
| 15 || May 1 || Reds || 8–3 || Pettit (1–0) || Perkowski || Dickson (1) || 14,826 || 6–9
|- bgcolor="ccffcc"
| 16 || May 2 || Reds || 12–4 || LaPalme (1–2) || Podbielan || — || 7,437 || 7–9
|- bgcolor="ccffcc"
| 17 || May 3 || Cardinals || 8–2 || Lindell (1–2) || Haddix || — || 26,001 || 8–9
|- bgcolor="ffbbbb"
| 18 || May 4 || Cardinals || 0–5 || Mizell || Dickson (2–3) || — || 18,778 || 8–10
|- bgcolor="ccffcc"
| 19 || May 9 || @ Giants || 2–0 || Lindell (2–2) || Jansen || — ||  || 9–10
|- bgcolor="ffbbbb"
| 20 || May 9 || @ Giants || 4–6 || Wilhelm || Pettit (1–1) || — || 9,889 || 9–11
|- bgcolor="ffbbbb"
| 21 || May 10 || @ Giants || 0–4 || Maglie || Dickson (2–4) || — ||  || 9–12
|- bgcolor="ffbbbb"
| 22 || May 10 || @ Giants || 2–3 || Hiller || Pollet (1–1) || — || 17,940 || 9–13
|- bgcolor="ffbbbb"
| 23 || May 14 || @ Braves || 2–3 || Wilson || Lindell (2–3) || — || 15,438 || 9–14
|- bgcolor="ffbbbb"
| 24 || May 15 || @ Braves || 3–4 || Surkont || Friend (1–2) || — || 8,744 || 9–15
|- bgcolor="ccffcc"
| 25 || May 16 || @ Cubs || 3–2 || Dickson (3–4) || Rush || Hetki (2) || 9,728 || 10–15
|- bgcolor="ffbbbb"
| 26 || May 17 || @ Cubs || 2–6 || Minner || LaPalme (1–3) || — ||  || 10–16
|- bgcolor="ffbbbb"
| 27 || May 17 || @ Cubs || 3–7 (7) || Klippstein || Pettit (1–2) || Hacker || 7,745 || 10–17
|- bgcolor="ffbbbb"
| 28 || May 19 || @ Cardinals || 1–2 || Staley || Lindell (2–4) || Miller || 7,607 || 10–18
|- bgcolor="ffbbbb"
| 29 || May 20 || @ Cardinals || 6–11 || Presko || Friend (1–3) || Brazle || 5,715 || 10–19
|- bgcolor="ccffcc"
| 30 || May 21 || Phillies || 7–2 || Dickson (4–4) || Drews || — || 7,507 || 11–19
|- bgcolor="ccffcc"
| 31 || May 23 || Giants || 8–4 || LaPalme (2–3) || Gomez || — || 7,444 || 12–19
|- bgcolor="ffbbbb"
| 32 || May 24 || Giants || 3–11 || Jansen || Lindell (2–5) || Wilhelm || 20,966 || 12–20
|- bgcolor="ffbbbb"
| 33 || May 25 || Giants || 3–6 || Hiller || Friend (1–4) || — || 2,369 || 12–21
|- bgcolor="ffbbbb"
| 34 || May 27 || Phillies || 2–14 || Roberts || Dickson (4–5) || — ||  || 12–22
|- bgcolor="ccffcc"
| 35 || May 27 || Phillies || 8–6 || Face (2–0) || Drews || Dickson (2) || 16,935 || 13–22
|- bgcolor="ffbbbb"
| 36 || May 28 || Phillies || 8–9 || Konstanty || LaPalme (2–4) || — || 2,437 || 13–23
|- bgcolor="ffbbbb"
| 37 || May 29 || Dodgers || 4–7 || Meyer || Lindell (2–6) || Hughes || 3,902 || 13–24
|- bgcolor="ffbbbb"
| 38 || May 30 || Dodgers || 4–7 || Wade || Dickson (4–6) || — ||  || 13–25
|- bgcolor="ffbbbb"
| 39 || May 30 || Dodgers || 1–4 || Podres || Friend (1–5) || Erskine || 31,029 || 13–26
|- bgcolor="ffbbbb"
| 40 || May 31 || @ Dodgers || 3–4 || Loes || LaPalme (2–5) || Hughes || 25,277 || 13–27
|- bgcolor="ffbbbb"
| 41 || May 31 || @ Dodgers || 1–4 (7) || Milliken || Hetki (0–1) || — || 25,277 || 13–28
|-

|- bgcolor="ccffcc"
| 42 || June 2 || Cubs || 4–3 (11) || Hetki (1–1) || Klippstein || — || 8,158 || 14–28
|- bgcolor="ccffcc"
| 43 || June 3 || Cubs || 1–0 || LaPalme (3–5) || Hacker || — || 8,165 || 15–28
|- bgcolor="ccffcc"
| 44 || June 4 || Cubs || 6–1 || Hall (1–1) || Minner || — || 3,182 || 16–28
|- bgcolor="ffbbbb"
| 45 || June 5 || Reds || 4–7 || Wehmeier || Bowman (0–1) || — || 12,229 || 16–29
|- bgcolor="ffbbbb"
| 46 || June 6 || Reds || 7–15 || Smith || Friend (1–6) || Collum || 6,685 || 16–30
|- bgcolor="ffbbbb"
| 47 || June 7 || Reds || 1–6 || Podbielan || Schultz (0–1) || — ||  || 16–31
|- bgcolor="ffbbbb"
| 48 || June 7 || Reds || 6–11 || Nuxhall || Lindell (2–7) || Perkowski || 9,021 || 16–32
|- bgcolor="ffbbbb"
| 49 || June 8 || Cardinals || 3–5 (12) || Brazle || Hetki (1–2) || Miller || 7,643 || 16–33
|- bgcolor="ccffcc"
| 50 || June 9 || Cardinals || 7–4 || Hall (2–1) || Haddix || — || 1,894 || 17–33
|- bgcolor="ffbbbb"
| 51 || June 10 || Cardinals || 1–5 || Presko || Friend (1–7) || White || 8,937 || 17–34
|- bgcolor="ffbbbb"
| 52 || June 11 || Cardinals || 3–5 || Miller || Lindell (2–8) || White || 2,178 || 17–35
|- bgcolor="ccffcc"
| 53 || June 12 || Braves || 4–2 || Dickson (5–6) || Antonelli || — ||  || 18–35
|- bgcolor="ffbbbb"
| 54 || June 12 || Braves || 2–11 || Surkont || Schultz (0–2) || — || 17,344 || 18–36
|- bgcolor="ffbbbb"
| 55 || June 13 || Braves || 4–5 || Burdette || LaPalme (3–6) || — || 5,134 || 18–37
|- bgcolor="ffbbbb"
| 56 || June 14 || Braves || 3–7 || Liddle || Hall (2–2) || — ||  || 18–38
|- bgcolor="ffbbbb"
| 57 || June 14 || Braves || 0–8 || Buhl || Bowman (0–2) || — || 15,083 || 18–39
|- bgcolor="ccffcc"
| 58 || June 15 || Braves || 3–2 (10) || Friend (2–7) || Wilson || — || 6,548 || 19–39
|- bgcolor="ccffcc"
| 59 || June 16 || @ Cubs || 6–5 || Lindell (3–8) || Minner || — ||  || 20–39
|- bgcolor="ffbbbb"
| 60 || June 16 || @ Cubs || 2–3 || Pollet || Dickson (5–7) || Klippstein || 11,427 || 20–40
|- bgcolor="ffbbbb"
| 61 || June 17 || @ Cubs || 4–5 (16) || Lown || Hetki (1–3) || — || 5,422 || 20–41
|- bgcolor="ffbbbb"
| 62 || June 18 || @ Cubs || 4–8 || Rush || Hall (2–3) || Leonard || 3,969 || 20–42
|- bgcolor="ffbbbb"
| 63 || June 19 || @ Cardinals || 2–10 || Mizell || LaPalme (3–7) || — || 7,552 || 20–43
|- bgcolor="ffbbbb"
| 64 || June 20 || @ Cardinals || 1–2 || Presko || Friend (2–8) || — || 9,019 || 20–44
|- bgcolor="ccffcc"
| 65 || June 21 || @ Cardinals || 5–2 || Dickson (6–7) || Miller || — || 10,451 || 21–44
|- bgcolor="ffbbbb"
| 66 || June 22 || @ Cardinals || 3–6 || Staley || Lindell (3–9) || — || 5,625 || 21–45
|- bgcolor="ccffcc"
| 67 || June 23 || @ Braves || 1–0 || Hall (3–3) || Spahn || — || 26,299 || 22–45
|- bgcolor="ccffcc"
| 68 || June 24 || @ Braves || 10–1 || Face (3–0) || Bickford || — || 21,438 || 23–45
|- bgcolor="ccffcc"
| 69 || June 25 || @ Braves || 6–4 (12) || Hetki (2–3) || Buhl || — || 14,841 || 24–45
|- bgcolor="ffbbbb"
| 70 || June 26 || @ Reds || 4–8 || Nuxhall || Dickson (6–8) || King ||  || 24–46
|- bgcolor="ffbbbb"
| 71 || June 26 || @ Reds || 1–4 || Collum || LaPalme (3–8) || — || 7,758 || 24–47
|- bgcolor="ffbbbb"
| 72 || June 27 || @ Reds || 5–15 || Perkowski || Face (3–1) || — || 2,599 || 24–48
|- bgcolor="ffbbbb"
| 73 || June 28 || @ Reds || 1–4 || Baczewski || Hall (3–4) || — ||  || 24–49
|- bgcolor="ffbbbb"
| 74 || June 28 || @ Reds || 2–9 || Raffensberger || Bowman (0–3) || — || 10,432 || 24–50
|- bgcolor="ccffcc"
| 75 || June 30 || @ Giants || 3–1 || Dickson (7–8) || Gomez || — || 13,805 || 25–50
|-

|- bgcolor="ccffcc"
| 76 || July 1 || @ Giants || 5–3 (11) || Hetki (3–3) || Wilhelm || — || 4,429 || 26–50
|- bgcolor="ffbbbb"
| 77 || July 4 || @ Dodgers || 5–6 || Hughes || Hall (3–5) || Wade || 30,029 || 26–51
|- bgcolor="ccffcc"
| 78 || July 4 || @ Dodgers || 5–2 || Friend (3–8) || Loes || — || 30,029 || 27–51
|- bgcolor="ffbbbb"
| 79 || July 5 || Phillies || 0–2 (10) || Roberts || Dickson (7–9) || — ||  || 27–52
|- bgcolor="ccffcc"
| 80 || July 5 || Phillies || 7–4 || Waugh (1–0) || Ridzik || LaPalme (1) || 11,404 || 28–52
|- bgcolor="ffbbbb"
| 81 || July 6 || Dodgers || 2–14 || Meyer || LaPalme (3–9) || Hughes || 13,497 || 28–53
|- bgcolor="ffbbbb"
| 82 || July 7 || Dodgers || 4–5 || Erskine || Lindell (3–10) || Wade ||  || 28–54
|- bgcolor="ffbbbb"
| 83 || July 7 || Dodgers || 5–9 || Roe || Hall (3–6) || Milliken || 9,687 || 28–55
|- bgcolor="ffbbbb"
| 84 || July 8 || Giants || 7–10 (11) || Jansen || Hetki (3–4) || Koslo || 7,095 || 28–56
|- bgcolor="ffbbbb"
| 85 || July 9 || Giants || 0–4 || Gomez || Face (3–2) || — || 3,391 || 28–57
|- bgcolor="ffbbbb"
| 86 || July 10 || @ Phillies || 3–13 || Simmons || Dickson (7–10) || — || 6,466 || 28–58
|- bgcolor="ffbbbb"
| 87 || July 11 || @ Phillies || 4–8 || Ridzik || Dickson (7–11) || — || 3,608 || 28–59
|- bgcolor="ffbbbb"
| 88 || July 12 || @ Phillies || 4–6 || Roberts || Face (3–3) || — ||  || 28–60
|- bgcolor="ffbbbb"
| 89 || July 12 || @ Phillies || 5–6 || Ridzik || LaPalme (3–10) || — || 10,806 || 28–61
|- bgcolor="ccffcc"
| 90 || July 16 || Braves || 5–2 || Friend (4–8) || Antonelli || — || 11,775 || 29–61
|- bgcolor="ffbbbb"
| 91 || July 17 || Braves || 2–8 || Spahn || Hall (3–7) || — || 11,565 || 29–62
|- bgcolor="ffbbbb"
| 92 || July 18 || Braves || 3–4 || Liddle || Waugh (1–1) || Burdette || 4,674 || 29–63
|- bgcolor="ffbbbb"
| 93 || July 19 || Cardinals || 2–8 || Haddix || Dickson (7–12) || — ||  || 29–64
|- bgcolor="ccffcc"
| 94 || July 19 || Cardinals || 6–4 || LaPalme (4–10) || Mizell || — || 9,045 || 30–64
|- bgcolor="ffbbbb"
| 95 || July 20 || Cardinals || 4–9 || Chambers || Friend (4–9) || White || 9,045 || 30–65
|- bgcolor="ffbbbb"
| 96 || July 21 || Reds || 2–7 || Raffensberger || Waugh (1–2) || — || 7,594 || 30–66
|- bgcolor="ccffcc"
| 97 || July 22 || Reds || 3–2 || LaPalme (5–10) || Collum || — || 1,567 || 31–66
|- bgcolor="ffbbbb"
| 98 || July 23 || Reds || 0–7 || Perkowski || Dickson (7–13) || — || 1,807 || 31–67
|- bgcolor="ffbbbb"
| 99 || July 24 || Cubs || 1–7 || Minner || Hall (3–8) || — || 10,406 || 31–68
|- bgcolor="ffbbbb"
| 100 || July 25 || Cubs || 4–5 || Lown || Lindell (3–11) || Leonard || 4,217 || 31–69
|- bgcolor="ccffcc"
| 101 || July 26 || Cubs || 3–2 || Face (4–3) || Leonard || — ||  || 32–69
|- bgcolor="ffbbbb"
| 102 || July 26 || Cubs || 3–7 || Hacker || Waugh (1–3) || Klippstein || 11,358 || 32–70
|- bgcolor="ffbbbb"
| 103 || July 28 || @ Cardinals || 4–6 || Chambers || LaPalme (5–11) || Presko || 7,973 || 32–71
|- bgcolor="ffbbbb"
| 104 || July 29 || @ Cardinals || 2–8 || Haddix || Lindell (3–12) || — || 7,418 || 32–72
|- bgcolor="ffbbbb"
| 105 || July 30 || @ Cardinals || 4–10 || Erautt || Hetki (3–5) || — || 3,402 || 32–73
|- bgcolor="ccffcc"
| 106 || July 31 || @ Cubs || 4–0 || Dickson (8–13) || Minner || — || 5,412 || 33–73
|-

|- bgcolor="ccffcc"
| 107 || August 1 || @ Cubs || 10–3 || Lindell (4–12) || Pollet || — || 8,017 || 34–73
|- bgcolor="ffbbbb"
| 108 || August 2 || @ Cubs || 6–7 (11) || Lown || Dickson (8–14) || — || 14,110 || 34–74
|- bgcolor="ffbbbb"
| 109 || August 3 || @ Reds || 0–5 || Nuxhall || LaPalme (5–12) || — || 3,499 || 34–75
|- bgcolor="ccffcc"
| 110 || August 4 || @ Reds || 2–1 || Face (5–3) || Collum || Dickson (3) || 4,463 || 35–75
|- bgcolor="ccffcc"
| 111 || August 5 || @ Reds || 6–4 || Waugh (2–3) || Podbielan || Hetki (3) || 1,797 || 36–75
|- bgcolor="ccffcc"
| 112 || August 6 || @ Reds || 4–3 || Lindell (5–12) || King || LaPalme (2) || 2,054 || 37–75
|- bgcolor="ffbbbb"
| 113 || August 7 || @ Braves || 2–9 || Bickford || Dickson (8–15) || — || 26,902 || 37–76
|- bgcolor="ffbbbb"
| 114 || August 8 || @ Braves || 4–7 || Burdette || Hall (3–9) || — || 17,163 || 37–77
|- bgcolor="ffbbbb"
| 115 || August 9 || @ Braves || 4–7 || Johnson || LaPalme (5–13) || Liddle ||  || 37–78
|- bgcolor="ffbbbb"
| 116 || August 9 || @ Braves || 3–10 || Wilson || Face (5–4) || — || 33,376 || 37–79
|- bgcolor="ffbbbb"
| 117 || August 11 || Phillies || 0–3 || Simmons || Dickson (8–16) || — || 8,985 || 37–80
|- bgcolor="ffbbbb"
| 118 || August 12 || Phillies || 4–8 || Roberts || Lindell (5–13) || — || 6,505 || 37–81
|- bgcolor="ccffcc"
| 119 || August 13 || Phillies || 4–3 || LaPalme (6–13) || Miller || — || 2,373 || 38–81
|- bgcolor="ffbbbb"
| 120 || August 15 || @ Dodgers || 6–14 || Wade || Face (5–5) || — || 12,842 || 38–82
|- bgcolor="ffbbbb"
| 121 || August 16 || @ Dodgers || 1–3 || Roe || Hall (3–10) || — || 18,550 || 38–83
|- bgcolor="ffbbbb"
| 122 || August 16 || @ Dodgers || 5–9 || Erskine || Dickson (8–17) || Labine || 18,550 || 38–84
|- bgcolor="ffbbbb"
| 123 || August 17 || @ Dodgers || 2–5 (11) || Labine || Lindell (5–14) || — || 9,943 || 38–85
|- bgcolor="ffbbbb"
| 124 || August 18 || @ Phillies || 0–1 || Ridzik || LaPalme (6–14) || Roberts || 3,945 || 38–86
|- bgcolor="ccffcc"
| 125 || August 19 || @ Phillies || 5–3 || Face (6–5) || Simmons || — || 4,554 || 39–86
|- bgcolor="ccffcc"
| 126 || August 20 || @ Phillies || 5–2 || Waugh (3–3) || Roberts || — || 4,376 || 40–86
|- bgcolor="ccffcc"
| 127 || August 21 || Dodgers || 7–1 || Dickson (9–17) || Podres || — || 12,459 || 41–86
|- bgcolor="ffbbbb"
| 128 || August 22 || Dodgers || 3–5 || Roe || Hall (3–11) || Labine || 7,033 || 41–87
|- bgcolor="ffbbbb"
| 129 || August 23 || Dodgers || 4–10 || Meyer || Lindell (5–15) || — || 1,848 || 41–88
|- bgcolor="ffbbbb"
| 130 || August 23 || Dodgers || 7–9 || Labine || Friend (4–10) || — || 1,848 || 41–89
|- bgcolor="ffbbbb"
| 131 || August 25 || Reds || 6–8 || Collum || Hetki (3–6) || Kelly ||  || 41–90
|- bgcolor="ffbbbb"
| 132 || August 25 || Reds || 8–9 || Baczewski || Bowman (0–4) || — || 8,370 || 41–91
|- bgcolor="ffbbbb"
| 133 || August 28 || Cardinals || 9–10 || White || Hall (3–12) || Staley || 7,021 || 41–92
|- bgcolor="ffbbbb"
| 134 || August 29 || Cardinals || 4–5 || Mizell || Dickson (9–18) || Brazle || 3,145 || 41–93
|- bgcolor="ffbbbb"
| 135 || August 30 || Braves || 4–19 || Antonelli || Lindell (5–16) || — ||  || 41–94
|- bgcolor="ffbbbb"
| 136 || August 30 || Braves || 5–11 || Liddle || LaPalme (6–15) || — || 9,458 || 41–95
|-

|- bgcolor="ccffcc"
| 137 || September 2 || Cubs || 8–1 || Friend (5–10) || Simpson || — || 5,659 || 42–95
|- bgcolor="ffbbbb"
| 138 || September 6 || Phillies || 2–7 || Drews || Face (6–6) || — || 5,890 || 42–96
|- bgcolor="ccffcc"
| 139 || September 7 || @ Giants || 9–7 || Friend (6–10) || Worthington || — ||  || 43–96
|- bgcolor="ccffcc"
| 140 || September 7 || @ Giants || 5–3 || LaPalme (7–15) || Hearn || — || 6,903 || 44–96
|- bgcolor="ffbbbb"
| 141 || September 9 || @ Cubs || 7–8 || Simpson || Face (6–7) || — || 2,319 || 44–97
|- bgcolor="ffbbbb"
| 142 || September 11 || @ Cardinals || 3–5 || Mizell || Waugh (3–4) || Brazle || 4,728 || 44–98
|- bgcolor="ccffcc"
| 143 || September 12 || @ Cardinals || 8–7 (12) || Dickson (10–18) || Chambers || — || 4,119 || 45–98
|- bgcolor="ccffcc"
| 144 || September 13 || @ Reds || 5–4 || LaPalme (8–15) || Raffensberger || — ||  || 46–98
|- bgcolor="ffbbbb"
| 145 || September 13 || @ Reds || 6–8 || Smith || Dickson (10–19) || — || 7,454 || 46–99
|- bgcolor="ccffcc"
| 146 || September 15 || @ Braves || 7–5 || Friend (7–10) || Burdette || Hall (1) || 32,145 || 47–99
|- bgcolor="ffbbbb"
| 147 || September 16 || @ Braves || 3–7 || Buhl || Face (6–8) || — || 18,912 || 47–100
|- bgcolor="ffbbbb"
| 148 || September 19 || @ Giants || 1–4 || Worthington || LaPalme (8–16) || Jansen ||  || 47–101
|- bgcolor="ccffcc"
| 149 || September 19 || @ Giants || 6–5 || Waugh (4–4) || Hearn || Dickson (4) || 2,744 || 48–101
|- bgcolor="ccffcc"
| 150 || September 20 || @ Giants || 8–4 || Friend (8–10) || Gomez || — || 4,717 || 49–101
|- bgcolor="ffbbbb"
| 151 || September 22 || @ Dodgers || 4–5 || Podres || Hogue (0–1) || Labine || 2,365 || 49–102
|- bgcolor="ffbbbb"
| 152 || September 25 || Giants || 2–6 || Worthington || Friend (8–11) || — || 3,367 || 49–103
|- bgcolor="ffbbbb"
| 153 || September 26 || Giants || 3–5 || Jansen || Waugh (4–5) || — || 1,385 || 49–104
|- bgcolor="ccffcc"
| 154 || September 27 || Giants || 6–4 || Hogue (1–1) || Corwin || — || 17,367 || 50–104
|-

|-
| Legend:       = Win       = LossBold = Pirates team member

Notable transactions 
 June 4, 1953: Ralph Kiner, Joe Garagiola, Catfish Metkovich, and Howie Pollet were traded by the Pirates to the Chicago Cubs for Toby Atwell, Bob Schultz, Preston Ward, George Freese, Bob Addis, Gene Hermanski, and $150,000.
 June 14, 1953: Pete Castiglione was traded by the Pirates to the St. Louis Cardinals for Hal Rice.

Roster

Player stats

Batting

Starters by position 
Note: Pos = Position; G = Games played; AB = At bats; H = Hits; Avg. = Batting average; HR = Home runs; RBI = Runs batted in

Other batters 
Note: G = Games played; AB = At bats; H = Hits; Avg. = Batting average; HR = Home runs; RBI = Runs batted in

Pitching

Starting pitchers 
Note: G = Games pitched; IP = Innings pitched; W = Wins; L = Losses; ERA = Earned run average; SO = Strikeouts

Other pitchers 
Note: G = Games pitched; IP = Innings pitched; W = Wins; L = Losses; ERA = Earned run average; SO = Strikeouts

Relief pitchers 
Note: G = Games pitched; W = Wins; L = Losses; SV = Saves; ERA = Earned run average; SO = Strikeouts

Farm system

References

External links 
 1953 Pittsburgh Pirates team page at Baseball Reference
 1953 Pittsburgh Pirates Page at Baseball Almanac

Pittsburgh Pirates seasons
Pittsburgh Pirates season
Pittsburg Pir